Even Aleksander Hagen (born 14 April 1988) is a Norwegian politician for the Labour Party.

Following the 2015 election, Hagen became the Chairman of the County Council (fylkesordfører) of Innlandet. He is also the youngest County Mayor in Norway ever.

Hagen, who hails from Otta, survived the terror attack at Utøya on 22 July 2011 on a Workers' Youth League-run summer camp. The attacks claimed a total of 77 lives. When nominated as the Labour Party's candidate for county mayor, he said that "You have nominated a gay terror victim".

References

1988 births
Living people
People from Sel
Oppland politicians
Labour Party (Norway) politicians
Chairmen of County Councils of Norway
Survivors of the 2011 Norway attacks
Politicians from Lillehammer
21st-century Norwegian politicians